Bayou Teche National Wildlife Refuge is located in the coastal towns of Franklin, Garden City and Centerville on Bayou Teche in St. Mary Parish, Louisiana, United States. The  refuge is forested with bottomland hardwoods and cypress-gum forests. The refuge was established in St. Mary Parish in 2001. The surrounding area includes oil and gas wells and canals.

Wildlife and habitat
The endangered Louisiana black bear is relatively abundant throughout the refuge. Other wildlife species of interest include alligators, wading birds, ducks and bald eagles.

See also
List of National Wildlife Refuges: Louisiana

References

 "Bayou Teche National Wildlife Refuge". U.S. Fish and Wildlife Service.

National Wildlife Refuges in Louisiana
Protected areas of St. Mary Parish, Louisiana
Protected areas established in 2001